The men's team épée was one of eight fencing events on the fencing at the 1972 Summer Olympics programme. It was the fourteenth appearance of the event. The competition was held from 8 to 9 September 1972. 94 fencers from 20 nations competed.

Rosters

Argentina
 Daniel Feraud
 Fernando Lupiz
 Guillermo Saucedo
 Omar Vergara

Austria
 Roland Losert
 Karl-Heinz Müller
 Herbert Polzhuber
 Rudolf Trost

Canada
 Magdy Conyd
 Herbert Obst
 Gerry Wiedel
 Lester Wong

Denmark
 Torben Bjerre-Poulsen
 Peter Askjær-Friis
 Ivan Kemnitz
 Reinhard Münster
 Jørgen Thorup

East Germany
 Harry Fiedler
 Eckhard Mannischeff
 Horst Melzig
 Hans-Peter Schulze
 Bernd Uhlig

France
 François Jeanne
 Jacques Brodin
 Pierre Marchand
 Jean-Pierre Allemand
 Jacques La Degaillerie

Great Britain
 Teddy Bourne
 Bill Hoskyns
 Edward Hudson
 Ralph Johnson
 Graham Paul

Hungary
 Csaba Fenyvesi
 Győző Kulcsár
 Pál Schmitt
 Sándor Erdős
 István Osztrics

Italy
 Claudio Francesconi
 Nicola Granieri
 Gianluigi Placella
 Gianluigi Saccaro
 Pier Alberto Testoni

Lebanon
 Ali Chekr
 Yves Daniel Darricau
 Fawzi Merhi
 Ali Sleiman

Luxembourg
 Alain Anen
 Aly Doerfel
 Romain Manelli
 Remo Manelli
 Robert Schiel

Mexico
 Carlos Calderón
 Jorge Castillejos
 Hermilo Leal
 Luis Stephens

Norway
 Jan von Koss
 Jeppe Normann
 Ole Mørch
 Claus Mørch Jr.

Poland
 Bohdan Andrzejewski
 Jerzy Janikowski
 Henryk Nielaba
 Kazimierz Barburski
 Bogdan Gonsior

Romania
 Constantin Duțu
 Costică Bărăgan
 Anton Pongratz
 Alexandru Istrate
 Nicolae Iorgu

Soviet Union
 Grigory Kriss
 Viktor Modzolevsky
 Georgi Zažitski
 Sergey Paramonov
 Igor Valetov

Sweden
 Hans Wieselgren
 Carl von Essen
 Orvar Jönsson
 Rolf Edling
 Per Sundberg

Switzerland
 Guy Evéquoz
 Peter Lötscher
 Daniel Giger
 Christian Kauter
 François Suchanecki

United States
 Scotty Bozek
 Paul Makler Jr.
 George Masin
 James Melcher
 Stephen Netburn

West Germany
 Reinhold Behr
 Hans-Jürgen Hehn
 Harald Hein
 Dieter Jung
 Max Geuter

Results

Round 1

Round 1 Pool A

Round 1 Pool B

Round 1 Pool C

Round 1 Pool D

Round 1 Pool E

Elimination rounds

Main bracket

5th place consolation bracket

References

Fencing at the 1972 Summer Olympics
Men's events at the 1972 Summer Olympics